The 2012 Epping Forest Council election took place on 3 May 2012 to elect members of Epping Forest Council in England. This was on same day as other 2012 United Kingdom local elections.

One-third of council were up for election. No elections were held this year in Broadley Common, Epping Upland and Nazeing, Chipping Ongar, Greensted and Marden Ash, Lambourne, Lower Nazeing, Lower Sheering, North Weald Bassett, Roydon, Shelley, Waltham Abbey High Beach or Waltham Abbey Paternoster.

This is the last time a British National Party councillor has sat in the chamber following Pat Richardson's defeat in Loughton Broadway to the Loughton Residents Association. Former British National Party councillor, Julian Leppert (who represented Hainault on Redbridge Borough Council) won a seat in 2019 in Waltham Abbey as a candidate for For Britain.

Boundary changes

There was an extra election this year in Hastingwood, Matching and Sheering Village ward following changes to the boundaries of Matching parish, which annexed part of Moreton and Fyfield ward. The Hastingwood, Matching and Sheering Village councillor was elected for a three-year term only.

Buckhurst Hill East

Buckhurst Hill West

Chigwell Row

Chigwell Village

Epping Hemnall

Epping Lindsey and Thornwood Common

Grange Hill

Hastingwood, Matching and Sheering Village

High Ongar, Willingale and the Rodings

Loughton Alderton

Loughton Broadway

Loughton Fairmead

Loughton Forest

Loughton Roding

Loughton St. John's

Loughton St. Mary's

Moreton and Fyfield

Passingford

Theydon Bois

Waltham Abbey Honey Lane

Waltham Abbey North East

Waltham Abbey South West

References

2012 English local elections
2012
2010s in Essex